Radu Greceanu National College is a high school located at 8 Nicolae Bălcescu Street, Slatina, Romania.

The school was established in 1886 and declared a gymnasium two years later. In 1891, it was named after , an 18th-century chronicler. It is a leading high school of Olt County.

The original school building was begun in August 1889 and completed in autumn 1891. A new wing was added in the 1920s, while an amphitheater and dormitory date to the following decade. Girls were admitted starting in the 1958–1959 school year, eventually leading to the construction of a second dormitory, completed in 1979. This was the last major addition.

The school building is listed as a historic monument by Romania's Ministry of Culture and Religious Affairs.

Faculty
 Iuliu Moisil

Alumni
 Gib Mihăescu
 Dumitru Popovici
 Ion Predescu
 Pan M. Vizirescu

Notes

External links
 Official site

Historic monuments in Olt County
Slatina, Romania
Schools in Olt County
Educational institutions established in 1886
1886 establishments in Romania
National Colleges in Romania
School buildings completed in 1891